The Project Manager Force Battle Command Brigade and Below is a component of the Program Executive Office Command Control and Communications Tactical (PEO C3T) Special Projects Office in the United States Army.  The phrase "brigade and below" in the name refers to the fact that operations and communications within these smaller Army units are shifting to a digital integration.

Mission
The mission of FBCB2 is to provide ever-improving and adaptive platform battle command capabilities to the force by understanding the performance gaps, developing solutions and delivering them to the field with sufficient training support to optimize the capabilities of the system.

History
FBCB2 was born out of the Task Force XXI Advanced Warfighting Experiment (AWE) in 1997. The 1st Brigade of the 4th Infantry Division was the first "digital" brigade and became fully equipped in 2000. The program has dramatically grown and matured, especially during the conduct of Operation Enduring Freedom and Operation Iraqi Freedom. Because FBCB2's capabilities are critically needed in the war effort, the program has been resourced to field 80,000 systems. By November 2008, over three-fourths (67,000) of those systems had already been fielded throughout the Army and United States Marine Corps (USMC).

In order to ensure interoperability between the Army and USMC, two Joint Requirements Oversight Council Memoranda (JROCM) 161–03 (2003) and 163–04 (2004), designated FBCB2 as the future battle command system for Joint forces at brigade and below.  As a result of lessons learned in OIF and OEF and JROCMs, the Army, Marine Corps and other stakeholders teamed up to develop the requirements for the follow-on to FBCB2 called Joint Battle Command-Platform (JBC-P).  The JBC-P CDD was approved by the Joint Requirements Oversight Council (JROC) in May 2008.  Equally important was the commitment extended by all Services to fully fund the JBC-P program.  Initial fielding of JBC-P Type 1 systems (called Joint Capabilities Release, or JCR) has begun for both Army and Marine Corps units and organizations.

The Army leadership adopted a more Systems of Systems Engineering (SOSE) approach toward Battle Command development and have formulated a concept of Unified Battle Command (UBC). The goal for UBC is to achieve an affordable, interoperable battle command capability across all of the Army's formations—maneuver, functional, and multi-functional brigades.  For platforms and soldiers, UBC will consist of a combination of Future Combat Systems (FCS) Battle Command (BC) and JBC-P computers, software and a new hybrid network of the Warfighter Information Network-Tactical (WIN-T), Joint Tactical Radio Systems (JTRS) and BFT 2. As the Army develops  JBC-P, it will do so with an eye toward achieving UBC capabilities.

Project Manager Force Battle Command Brigade and Below (PM FBCB2)
PM FBCB2 provides the United States Army most of the hardware, software, communications and network management for the FBCB2/Joint Battle Command-Platform (JBC-P) system; integrates the FBCB2 system on aviation and ground vehicle platforms, and dismounted soldiers; provides system fielding, training and support.

What FBCB2 provides to military
The FBCB2 end product is the battle command capability it brings to the individual Soldier. This capability is brought to the fight through the integration of Software, Hardware, Communications and network Infrastructure.

Software products
FBCB2 Version 6.4-Fielded now
FBCB2 Version 6.5-Pending fielding decision
FBCB2 Joint Capabilities Release 1.0-In developmental testing. It brings many key capabilities to the fight
Joint Battle Command-Platform (JBC-P)- Future Software (SW) versions supporting the JBC-P Capabilities Description Document (CDD)

Computer hardware
The vast majority of ground platforms use the PM FBCB2 procured Enhanced Version 4 FBCB2 Computer (EV4) ruggedized computer or the newer more powerful Joint Version 5, FBCB2 Computer (JV5) computer.

Communications
FBCB2 leverages the Enhanced Position Location Reporting System (EPLRS) tactical radio network in 15 Brigades (approximately 20% of our Army units).  For the remainder of the force structure (approximately 80% of our units), FBCB2 provides an on-the-move L- Band satellite communications transceiver, commonly referred to as Blue Force Tracking (BFT).

Network Infrastructure
Though not seen by soldiers, the BFT Global Network (BGN) Operation Centers are critical infrastructure sites that optimize the dissemination of data on the BFT network as well as the sharing of BFT data with EPLRS brigades operating in the Secret Domain.

Blue Force Tracking-Aviation (BFT-AVN)
Within the Force XXI Battle Command Brigade & Below program, BFT-AVN is a system with varied configurations that allow integration into various Army, joint, and coalition rotary and fixed-wing aircraft types. The system provides commanders, staffs, and other key personnel Situational Awareness of Aviation assets, including Unmanned Aerial Vehicles.  With BFT-AVN, aircrews are able to view positions of friendly forces as well as enemy locations.  The system also enables rapid, dynamic tasking and re-tasking of those assets to accomplish Aviation missions in complex environments.  Another key capability of BFT-AVN is the ability to send and receive data and messages beyond line-of-sight overcoming the communication challenges of distance and terrain.

Blue Force Tracking During Operation Iraqi Freedom 
All excerpts in quotations are direct quotes from conversations with battle leaders unless otherwise noted. The basic question was simple –How did you use Blue Force Tracking and how did it work?

Battle Tracking:

2–7) Used it to supplement battle tracking, which was still done with paper maps, but to do so they did not have to use radios for that purpose. They tracked the whole battle order, even assets from other Brigades or Divisions.

(A2-69) Used it to anticipate the arrival of specific vehicles into visual range in specific locations.

(A-2-69) Tracked battles at night in zero illumination, zero visibility.

(3ID Ops) Used extensively. Said it cleared the command net so they could do maneuvers.

(3–7) My Executive Officer and Operations Officer used it to track the battle and identify an approximate frontline trace.

"I'm the lead company of the lead task force of the lead brigade. That was my mission throughout this entire war. I led third brigade. There was nobody to my front. ... I was able to look on my screen and see where my friendly units were to my left, to my right, to my front, to my rear and able to pass that information immediately down to my platoons, so fratricide was basically eliminated." – CPT Stewart James, Team Assassin Commander, 2–69 Armor

"We could look at that thing, call the boss next door and say, 'Okay I'm tracking third brigade. Lead elements of third brigade are about 15 kilometers and are right behind us and they're moving up right now.' And then I could call units and I could say, 'Okay, we got, it looks like third brigade we'll be up in our Area of Operations (AO) in about ten minutes or fifteen minutes.'" – MAJ Brad Gavel, Operations Officer, 3rd Squadron 7th Cavalry Regiment

"We used it to coordinate units passing through us on the move. We'd get an e-mail saying 'We're coming up behind you. What's going on up there, you tell them before you can talk to him Frequency Modulation (FM), send him that Situation Report (SITREP). Or even, 'My idea is this.' 'Meet me here.' 'When I get close give me a call.' Just little stuff like that." – MAJ John Keith, Executive Officer, 3rd Squadron 7th Cavalry Regiment

Operational details
The primary difference between FBCB2 and Blue Force Tracking (BFT) is in the communications path for the data. They are both "FBCB2". The Hardware and Software are the same.  The ubiquitous Satellite Communications (SATCOM) configuration has become commonly referred to as "Blue Force Tracking", while the common terminology for terrestrial configuration with EPLRS has remained "FBCB2".  The US Marine Corps variant, while identical to the US Army version, is referred to as JBC-P (Joint Battle Command - Platform) FoS (Family of Systems), and is no longer referred to as FBCB2.

External links
 Official FBCB2 website

United States Army organization